Architectural Digest is an American monthly magazine founded in 1920. Its principal subjects are interior design and landscaping, rather than pure external architecture. The magazine is published by Condé Nast, which also publishes international editions of Architectural Digest in Italy, China, France, Germany, India, Spain, Mexico/Latin America and the Middle East

Architectural Digest is aimed at an affluent and style-conscious readership, and is subtitled "The International Design Authority." The magazine releases the annual AD100 list, which recognizes the most influential interior designers and architects around the world. 

Architectural Digest also hosts a popular online video series entitled Open Door that gives an in-depth look at the unique homes of various prominent celebrities and public figures.

History
Originally a quarterly trade directory called The Architectural Digest: A Pictorial Digest of California's Best Architecture, the magazine was launched in 1920 by John Coke Brasfield (1880–1962). Brasfield, born in Tennessee, moved to southern California in the early 1900s, where he founded the John C. Brasfield Publishing Corporation in Los Angeles. Interiors and exteriors of residences were featured in the magazine, along with floor plans.

By 1963, the magazine's subtitle had been altered to A Pictorial Digest of Outstanding Architecture, Interior Design, and Landscaping, and it began publishing on a bimonthly schedule. In 1965, The Architectural Digest and its publishing company were purchased by Cleon T. Knapp, who was the magazine's "jack-of-all-trades" and Brasfield's grandson. Knapp son of Brasfield's daughter Sarah "Sally" Brasfield Knapp (1910–1996), who served, at various times, as the magazine's editor in chief, managing editor, and associate publisher. The magazine's subtitle was altered to The Quality Guide to Home Decorating Ideas in 1966, and was changed again, in 1971, to The Connoisseur's Magazine of Fine Interior Design, and in 1976 to The International Magazine of Fine Interior Design. The John C. Brasfield Publishing Company was renamed Knapp Communications Corporation in 1977.

Condé Nast Publications purchased Architectural Digest, as well as its sister publication Bon Appétit, from Knapp in 1993.

In 2011 the Chinese version of the magazine, AD China, was launched. The magazine is also published in other countries, including Germany, India, France Italy, United States and Spain.

Architectural Digest won the 2020 Webby People’s Voice Award for Architecture & Design in the category Web.

Architectural Digest employees unionized in 2022. Also in 2022 Architectural Digest Russia closed after Condé Nast pulled out of Russia.

Editors in chief
John C. Brasfield, 1920–1960
(James) Bradley Little 1960–1965; a former interior designer, who served as editorial director and editor in chief from 1964 until his death in 1971.
Cleon T. Knapp, 1965–1974 (also served as publisher during the same period)
Paige Rense, 1975–2010; she previously served as the magazine's associate editor, 1968–1971, and its executive editor, 1971–1975. 
Margaret Russell, 2010–2016
Amy Astley, 2016–present

Since the 2010 change in leadership, the magazine has seen a shift towards featuring lighter, more open interiors, brighter photography, and a modern graphic style.

References

External links
 

Visual arts magazines published in the United States
Monthly magazines published in the United States
Quarterly magazines published in the United States
Architecture magazines
Condé Nast magazines
Magazines established in 1920
Magazines published in New York City
Design magazines